Carleton is a civil parish in Kent County, New Brunswick, Canada.

For governance purposes it is mainly part of the Kent rural district, which is a member of the Kent Regional Service Commission. Small areas on the southern and western boundaries belong to the town of Beaurivage and the village of Nouvelle-Arcadie, respectively.

Prior to the 2023 governance reform, the parish was divided between the local service districts of Pointe-Sapin and the parish of Carleton.

Origin of name
The parish was named for Thomas Carleton, first Governor of New Brunswick.

History
Carleton was erected in 1814 as part of Northumberland County from Newcastle Parish. It included Acadieville, Richibucto, Saint-Louis, and Weldford Parishes.

In 1827 Richibucto was erected as Liverpool Parish, including modern Weldford Parish.

In 1845 the boundary with Northumberland County was adjusted, adding area to Carleton.

In 1855 Saint-Louis was erected as Palmerston Parish.

In 1857 the boundary with Palmerston was adjusted to run along grant lines.

In 1876 Acadieville was erected as its own parish.

In 1888 a small area at Point Escuminac was returned to Northumberland County.

Boundaries
Carleton Parish is bounded:

on the northwest by the Northumberland County line;
on the east by Northumberland Strait, Kouchibouguac Bay, and Saint-Louis Bay;
on the south by a line beginning on the shore of Kouchibouguac Bay at the prolongation of the southern line of a grant about 1.5 kilometres south of the mouth of Ruisseau des Major in Kouchibouguac National Park, then running southwesterly along the grant line and its prolongation past Ruisseau des Major to the southernmost corner of the second grant, then northerly to the southern line of a grant straddling the Kouchibouguac River, then along the southern lines of five river grants until it strikes the prolongation of the starting grant line, then westerly along the prolongation to Route 134, then northwesterly along Route 134 to the southern line of Kouchibouguac River grants, then southwesterly along the northern line of two grants on either side of Route 11 and a third grant, to the northwestern corner of the third grant, then south 75º 30' west past Route 480 to the prolongation of the eastern line of a grant on the eastern edge of Saint-Luc;
on the west by the eastern line of a grant in Saint-Luc prolonged southerly to the Saint-Louis Parish line and northerly to the Northumberland County line.

Communities
Communities at least partly within the parish;

Claire-Fontaine
Fontaine
Kouchibouguac
Laketon
Loggiecroft
Middle Kouchibouguac
Pointe-Sapin
Pointe-Sapin-Centre
Rivière-au-Portage
Saint-Camille
South Kouchibouguac
Tweedie Brook

Bodies of water
Bodies of water at least partly in the parish:

Rivière à l'Anguille
Black River
Escuminac River
Fontaine River
Kouchibouguac River
Portage River
Portage-sud River
Kouchibouguac Bay
Le Barachois
Little Gully
Lac à Livain
Lac des Irlandais
Hells Gate Lake
Laketon Lake
Round Lake
Sullivans Lake

Other notable places
Parks, historic sites, and other noteworthy places at least partly in the parish.

 Black River Protected Natural Area
 Kouchibouguac National Park

Demographics
Revised census figures based on the 2023 local governance reforms have not been released.

Population
Population trend

Language
Mother tongue (2016)

See also
List of parishes in New Brunswick

Notes

References

Parishes of Kent County, New Brunswick
Local service districts of Kent County, New Brunswick